Zompa is a village of Arapgir. It has population of about 318 (2000). 

Towns in Turkey